DNA-binding protein inhibitor ID-1 is a protein that in humans is encoded by the ID1 gene.

Function 

The protein encoded by this gene is a helix-loop-helix (HLH)  protein that can form heterodimers with members of the basic HLH family of transcription factors. The encoded protein has no DNA binding activity and therefore can inhibit the DNA binding and transcriptional activation ability of basic HLH proteins with which it interacts. This protein may play a role in cell growth, senescence, and differentiation. Two transcript variants encoding different isoforms have been found for this gene.

Interactions 

ID1 has been shown to interact weakly with MyoD but very tightly with ubiquitously expressed E proteins. E proteins heterodimerize with tissue restricted bHLH proteins such as Myod, NeuroD, etc. to form active transcription complexes so by sequestering E proteins, Id proteins can inhibit tissue restricted gene expression in multiple cell lineages using the same biochemical mechanism. Other interacting partners include CASK.

Clinical significance 

ID1 can be used to mark endothelial progenitor cells which are critical to tumor growth and angiogenesis. Targeting ID1 results in decreased tumor growth. ID1 has been shown to be targeted by cannabidiol in certain gliomas and breast cancers.

See also 
 Inhibitor of DNA-binding protein

References

Further reading

External links 
 
 

Transcription factors
Aging-related genes